That Uncertain Feeling is a comic novel by Kingsley Amis, first published in 1955.

In 1961, the book was made into a film starring Peter Sellers, with the title changed to Only Two Can Play, to avoid confusion with similar contemporary titles. It was also adapted by the BBC in 1986 as a television series, starring Denis Lawson and Sheila Gish, this time with the original title.

Plot
A satire on life and culture in a Welsh seaside town, the story concerns a married librarian who begins an affair with the bored wife of a local bigwig. Amis, an English incomer to Swansea in real life, mocks Wales's devotion to culture and learning as false and pretentious. In The Old Devils, one of the central characters, the writer Alun Weaver, is portrayed as a "stage-Taffy"; Weaver is the memoirist of a fictional Welsh poet based loosely on Dylan Thomas.

References

1955 British novels
Adultery in novels
British comedy novels
British novels adapted into films
Novels set in Wales
Novels by Kingsley Amis
Victor Gollancz Ltd books